Christian Sebastián Cejas (born 21 April 1975) is an Argentine former footballer that played as goalkeeper and his last club was Chacarita Juniors of the Primera B Nacional. Nicknamed Terremoto (Earthquake), he also played for teams such as Newell's Old Boys, Fiorentina, and Colo-Colo.

Career
Cejas began his career in 1994 in his native country Argentina, where he appeared in 170 games and scored six goals for Newell's Old Boys. From there he was transferred to Roma in 2001. While with Newell's Old Boys, Cejas was a regular with the first team. That was not the case while he was with Roma, where he never appeared in a match. Cejas was loaned out to the than Serie B club Siena, where he appeared in the last seventeen games of the season. From there he was transferred to a Serie B club Ascoli. There he appeared in 35 games and scored a rare goal for goalkeeper in Italian football.

Cejas was then sold to another Serie B squad Fiorentina. Prior to his arrival, Fiorentina had gained promotion from Serie C2 to Serie C1. However, because of Caso Catania, Fiorentina gained promotion to Serie B. Cejas than helped complete the remarkable comeback of Fiorentina to Serie A. He appeared in 55 league games with the club before being sold to Empoli.

On 25 January 2006, Fiorentina acquired goalkeeper Gianluca Berti from Empoli in exchange for Cejas. However he only appeared in six games with Empoli before asking the club to terminate his contract. Cejas was upset that he had been dropped from the first team squad.

After Colo-Colo won the 2006 Apertura in Chile, their goalkeeper Claudio Bravo, made a move to La Liga club Real Sociedad, leaving them without a goalkeeper. Colo-Colo then signed Cejas as a replacement. He helped Colo-Colo win the 2006 Clausura and 2007 Apertura, as well as reaching the 2006 Copa Sudamericana Finals.

In July 2008, Cejas joined Premier League club Hull City on trial, but was not offered a contract by the Premier League newcomers. On 22 February 2009, Serie B club Pisa announced the signing of Cejas on a free transfer as a replacement for outgoing veternal keeper Daniele Balli.

Family
His younger brother Mauro Cejas plays for Tecos UAG in Mexico.

Honours
Colo-Colo
Primera División de Chile: 2006 Clausura, 2007 Apertura

References

External links
 Statistics at Irish Times
 Argentine Primera statistics at Futbol XXI
Lega Serie A Profile 

1975 births
Living people
Argentine footballers
Association football goalkeepers
Newell's Old Boys footballers
Chacarita Juniors footballers
A.S. Roma players
A.C.N. Siena 1904 players
Ascoli Calcio 1898 F.C. players
ACF Fiorentina players
Empoli F.C. players
Pisa S.C. players
Colo-Colo footballers
Club de Gimnasia y Esgrima La Plata footballers
People from Gualeguay Department
Chilean Primera División players
Argentine Primera División players
Serie A players
Serie B players
Expatriate footballers in Italy
Expatriate footballers in Chile
Argentine expatriate footballers
Argentine expatriate sportspeople in Italy
Sportspeople from Entre Ríos Province